Harry J. Bates (July 1890 – after 1912) was an English footballer who played in the Football League for Birmingham.

Bates was born in Sutton Coldfield, Warwickshire. An outside right who never turned professional, he played football for Ravensmoor and for Coventry City before joining Birmingham in 1912. He made his debut in the Second Division on 27 January 1912, in a 2–0 home win against Stockport County, and played once more that season and once in 1912–13, but failed to impress, and moved on to Walsall in the 1913 close season. Bates died in Birmingham.

References

1890 births
Year of death missing
Sportspeople from Sutton Coldfield
English footballers
Association football forwards
Coventry City F.C. players
Birmingham City F.C. players
Walsall F.C. players
English Football League players